Munyegera is an administrative ward in Buhigwe District  of Kigoma Region of Tanzania. In 2016 the Tanzania National Bureau of Statistics report there were 14,801 people in the ward, from 13,447 in 2012.

Villages / neighborhoods 
The ward has 2 villages and 7 hamlets.

 Munyegera 
 Kabuye
 Nyakitanga
 Samgari
 Songambele 
 Kumsenga
 Katenda
 Buyonga
 Ruhumba

References

Buhigwe District
Wards of Kigoma Region